Lithuania competed at the 2015 European Games, in Baku, Azerbaijan from 12 to 28 June 2015.

Medalists

Archery

Badminton

 Men's Singles: Kęstutis Navickas
 Women's Singles: Akvilė Stapušaitytė
 Men's Doubles: Alan Plavin, Povilas Bartušis
 Mixed Doubles: Vytautė Fomkinaitė, Povilas Bartušis

Basketball

 Men's 3x3 Team: Ovidijus Varanauskas, Darius Tarvydas, Vitalijus Lukša, Giedrius Marčiukaitis 
 Women's 3x3 Team: Kristina Alminaitė, Erika Liutkutė, Eglė Tarasevičiūtė, Kornelija Balčiūnaitė

Boxing

6 boxers will represent Lithuania.

 Men's 60 kg – Edgaras Skurdelis
 Men's 64 kg – Evaldas Petrauskas1
 Men's 69 kg – Eimantas Stanionis1
 Men's 75 kg – Tomas Pivarūnas
 Men's 91 kg – Tadas Tamašauskas
 Men's over 91 kg – Mantas Valavičius

1 – Evaldas Petrauskas and Eimantas Stanionis withdrew from participating in the European Games on the opening day due APB league schedule change.

Canoeing

Lithuania will be represented by 7 athletes.

Henrikas Žustautas, Aurimas Lankas, Edvinas Ramanauskas, Ignas Navakauskas, Andrej Olijnik, Ričardas Nekriošius, Anelė Šakalytė

Cycling

BMX
 Men's individual: Arminas Kazlauskis
 Women's individual: Vilma Rimšaitė

Road
 Men's individual – Ignatas Konovalovas, Evaldas Šiškevičius, Žydrūnas Savickas
 Women's individual – Daiva Tušlaitė, Aušrinė Trebaitė

Diving

Indrė Marija Girdauskaitė
Daniela Aleksandravičiūtė
Martynas Pabalys

Gymnastics

Artistic
Lithuania has qualified one female and one male athletes after the performance at the 2014 European Artistic Gymnastics Championship.
 Men's individual – Rokas Guščinas
 Women's individual – Vaida Zitinevičiūtė

Judo

4 judokas will represent Lithuania: Karolis Bauža, Marius Paškevičius, Sandra Jablonskytė, Santa Pakenytė

Sambo

 Men's −90 kg – Radvilas Matukas 
 Women's −52 kg – Rūta Aksionova

Shooting

 Men's Rifle – Karolis Girulis
 Men's Skeet – Ronaldas Račinskas

Swimming 

Andrius Šidlauskas
Paulius Grigaliūnas
Edvinas Mažintas
Diana Jaruševičiūtė
Agnė Šeleikaitė
Bena Sarapaitė
Meda Kulbačiauskaitė
Greta Gataveckaitė
Greta Pleikytė

Table tennis

Women's singles – Rūta Paškauskienė

Triathlon

Men's individual – Tautvydas Kopūstas

Volleyball

Beach
Men's Team – Lukas Každailis/Arnas Rumševičius
Women's Team – Ieva Dumbauskaitė/Monika Povilaitytė

Wrestling

Lithuania qualified 11 wrestlers to 2015 European Games.

Edgaras Venckaitis, Valdemaras Venckaitis, Julius Matuzevičius, Aleksandr Kazakevič, Mantas Knystautas, Vilius Laurinaitis, Jonas Rudavičius, Šarūnas Jurčys, Mindaugas Rumbutis, Giedrė Blekaitytė, Danutė Domikaitytė

References

Nations at the 2015 European Games
European Games
2015